A debubblizer is a surface tension reducing agent that is used to reduce the prevalence of bubbles in industrial processes such as wax casting. In some manufacturing operations, it is also referred to as surfactant or a wetting agent that is sprayed on the set impression material (e.g. to improve wettability). Its reduction of surface tension allows adherence of investment to pattern or cast. Without this solution, air bubbles tend to be trapped in plaster slurries once they are cast against impression materials (e.g. silicone rubbers) or wax casting patterns.

In engineering, debubblizer pertains to an individual or a device that removes bubbles from plastic tubing or rods.

References

Industrial processes